Alfred Teumer (11 February 1918 – 4 October 1944) was a German Luftwaffe military aviator and fighter ace during World War II. He is credited with 76 aerial victories claimed in over 300 combat missions. This figure includes 66 aerial victories on the Eastern Front, and further ten claims over the Western Allies.

Born in Neustadt am Rübenberge, Teumer grew up in the Weimar Republic and Nazi Germany. In December 1941, he was posted to Jagdgeschwader 54 (JG 54—54th Fighter Wing) which was fighting on the Eastern Front. Flying with this wing, Teumer claimed his first aerial victory on 28 December 1941 during the Siege of Leningrad. Teumer was appointed Staffelkapitän (squadron leader) of 5. Staffel (5th squadron) of JG 54 in April 1943. He then commanded the newly created 10. Staffel of JG 54 before he was wounded in combat on 3 September 1943. Following his recovery, he was given command of 2. Staffel of JG 54 in December 1943. In April 1944, Teumer was transferred to 7. Staffel of JG 54 which was fighting in Defense of the Reich on the Western Front. On 19 August 1944, Teumer was awarded the Knight's Cross of the Iron Cross for 76 aerial victories claimed. He was then transferred to Kommando Nowotny, an experimental unit flying the Messerschmitt Me 262 jet fighter. Teumer was killed in a flying accident on 4 October 1944 at Hesepe airfield when his Me 262 suffered engine failure during the landing approach.

Career
Teumer was posted to 3. Staffel (3rd squadron) of Jagdgeschwader 54 (JG 54—54th Fighter Wing) on 2 December 1941 during the final days of Operation Barbarossa holding the rank of Leutnant. At the time, 3. Staffel was temporarily commanded by Oberleutnant Max-Hellmuth Ostermann, who was substituting for Oberleutnant Hans Schmoller-Haldy. The Staffel was subordinated to Gruppe (1st group) of JG 54 headed by Hauptmann Erich von Selle and was based at Krasnogvardeysk, present-day Gatchina. The Gruppe fought in the northern sector of the Eastern Front in the aerial battles of the Siege of Leningrad.

War against the Soviet Union
On 28 December 1941, I. Gruppe flew combat air patrols along the Volkhov where German ground forces were retreating fighting against the Volkhov Front. During these missions, Teumer claimed his first aerial victory when he shot down a Petlyakov Pe-2 bomber. On 5 January 1942, command of I. Gruppe was given to Hauptmann Franz Eckerle when Selle was transferred. Teumer claimed his second aerial victory on 9 January over a I-26 fighter, an early war German designation for the Yakovlev Yak-1. That day, the Gruppe again flew missions in support of the Heer (army) along the Volkhov in the combat area southeast of Leningrad near Tosno. Two days later, flying over the same combat area, Teumer was credited with two I-18 fighters shot down, a reference to the Mikoyan-Gurevich MiG-1 fighter aircraft. The fighting along the Volkhov continued in the second half of January, predominately in the area between Leningrad and Shlisselburg. On 26 January, Teumer claimed his fifth aerial victory when he shot down a Pe-2 bomber. Then on 30 January, Teumer made an emergency landing in his Messerschmitt Bf 109 F-2 (Werknummer 9685—factory number) at Chudovo, damaging the aircraft to 40%. On 14 February, Eckerle was killed in action and command of I. Gruppe went to Hauptmann Hans Philipp. In early March, the Gruppe supported the German 18th Army which was fighting in the Battle of Lyuban. In these battles, Teumer claimed a Curtiss P-40 Warhawk fighter on 5 March. The next day, he was credited with another P-40 fighter and an I-18 fighter shot down.

Teumer was appointed Staffelkapitän (squadron leader) of 5. Staffel of JG 54 in April 1943. He replaced Hauptmann Paul Steindl who was transferred. On 20 June, the creation of a newly formed IV. Gruppe (4th group) of JG 54 was ordered. Its first commander was Hauptmann Erich Rudorffer. Teumer was tasked with the creation of 10. Staffel in July, a squadron of IV. Gruppe. On 3 September, he was wounded in aerial combat flying a Bf 109 G-6 northwest of Gatchina. He was replaced Oberleutnant Robert Weiß as commander of 10. Staffel. During his convalescence, Teumer was awarded the German Cross in Gold on 17 October. After his recovery, he took command of 2. Staffel of JG 54 from Oberleutnant Otto Vinzent in December 1943.

Western Front

In April 1944, Teumer was transferred to 7. Staffel of JG 54. He took command of the Staffel from Oberleutnant Rudolf Klemm who had been wounded in aerial combat on 9 April. The Staffel was subordinated to III. Gruppe led by Major Werner Schröer. At the time, the Gruppe was based at Lüneburg Airfield and subordinated to 2. Jagd-Division (2nd Fighter Division) fighting in Defence of the Reich. On 20 April, III. Gruppe relocated to Landau an der Isar for conversion training to the Focke Wulf Fw 190. In consequence of this relocation, the Gruppe came under the control of 7. Jagd-Division (7th Fighter Division). Conversion training was relatively short and the Gruppe flew its first mission on the Fw 190 against attacking United States Army Air Forces (USAAF) heavy bombers on 19 May. That day, Teumer was credited with an Herausschuss (separation shot)—a severely damaged heavy bomber forced to separate from its combat box which was counted as an aerial victory—over a Consolidated B-24 Liberator bomber. The Gruppe flew further missions on 22, 24, 25, 27, 28 and 29 May. On 24 May, Teumer was credited with shooting down a Boeing B-17 Flying Fortress bomber followed by another Herausschuss over a B-17 bomber on 27 May.

When Allied forces launched Operation Overlord, the invasion of German-occupied Western Europe on 6 June, III. Gruppe was immediately ordered to relocate to Villacoublay Airfield. That day, the Gruppe reached Nancy, arriving in Villacoublay the following day where it was subordinated to II. Fliegerkorps (2nd Air Corps). Its primary objective was to fly fighter-bomber missions in support of the German ground forces. The Gruppe flew its first missions on 7 June to the combat area east of Caen and the Orne estuary. Teumer claimed his first aerial victory in this combat area on 8 June when he shot down a USAAF North American P-51 Mustang fighter. Two days later, he was shot down in aerial combat near the Orne estuary. He managed to bail out of his Fw 190 A-8 ZY (Werknummer 730384) but was wounded in the encounter. In July, the Gruppe supported the German forces fighting in the Battle of Saint-Lô and the combat area near Paris predominantly under the control of Jagdgeschwader 26 "Schlageter" (JG 26—26th Fighter Wing). In these battles, Teumer claimed a Lockheed P-38 Lightning fighter on 26 July. In early August, combat shifted to Avranches, Mortain and Falaise. On 8 and 9 August, Teumer was credited with two further P-38 fighters shot down, one on each of these dates.

On 16 August, III. Gruppe was withdrawn from the front and sent to München Gladbach, present-day Mönchengladbach, for a period of rest and replenishment. There, Teumer was awarded the Knight's Cross of the Iron Cross on 19 August 1944 for 76 aerial victories claimed. During this period, Teumer served as acting Gruppenkommandeur (group commander) of III. Gruppe until 17 September. Teumer, who was childhood friend of Martin Drewes, took command of 2. Staffel of Kommando Nowotny, flying the Messerschmitt Me 262 jet fighter. The unit was named after Major Walter Nowotny and was tasked with testing the Me 262 under operational conditions. Teumer, who had received some training on the Me 262 at Rechlin, was killed in a flying accident on 4 October 1944 at Hesepe airfield. His Me 262 A-1a (Werknummer 170044) had suffered engine failure during the landing approach.

Summary of career

Aerial victory claims
According to Spick, Teumer was credited with 76 aerial victories, 66 of which on the Eastern Front and ten on the Western Front, claimed in over 300 combat missions. Mathews and Foreman, authors of Luftwaffe Aces — Biographies and Victory Claims, researched the German Federal Archives and found records for 74 aerial victory claims. This figure includes 67 aerial victories on the Eastern Front and seven over the Western Allies, including three four-engined bombers.

Victory claims were logged to a map-reference (PQ = Planquadrat), for example "PQ 00283". These sectors were then subdivided into 36 smaller units to give a location area 3 × 4 km in size.

Awards
 Iron Cross (1939) 2nd and 1st Class
 Honour Goblet of the Luftwaffe on 12 April 1943 as Oberleutnant and pilot
 German Cross in Gold on 17 October 1943 as Oberleutnant in the VI./Jagdgeschwader 54
 Knight's Cross of the Iron Cross on 19 August 1944 as Oberleutnant and Staffelkapitän of the 7./Jagdgeschwader 54

Notes

References

Citations

Bibliography

 
 
 
 
 
 
 
 
 
 
 
 
 
 
 
 
 

1918 births
1944 deaths
Aviators killed in aviation accidents or incidents in Germany
German World War II flying aces
Recipients of the Gold German Cross
Recipients of the Knight's Cross of the Iron Cross
Luftwaffe personnel killed in World War II
People from Neustadt am Rübenberge
People from the Province of Hanover
Victims of aviation accidents or incidents in 1944
Military personnel from Lower Saxony